The Kellogg-Mackay Company Buildings are two warehouses located in Kansas City, Missouri which have been used by various companies for manufacturing, transfer, storage, and administrative purposes, most significantly by the Kellogg-Mackay Company from 1919-1930. Due to their connection to historical railroad-related commerce in Kansas City, the buildings were listed on the National Register of Historic Places on June 27, 2022.

Site 
The buildings are privately owned, but the nominated boundary extends into the public right-of-way to include a concrete loading dock located on the east side of the buildings.

Rail spur lines used to be present on the west elevation that would have allowed for the transfer of goods from rail cars to the building, however, these are no longer visible.

Architecture 
The southernmost building, 2026-2030 Walnut Street, was constructed in 1892. The original architect and builder are unknown. It is three-stories tall and made of brick. It has an open floor plate and its structure is typical for the period with load-bearing brick exterior walls and a heavy timber internal structural system. The foundation is stone.

The newer northern building, 2020-2024 Walnut Street, was constructed in 1926 and abuts the side of the older building. Walter A. Besecke is the only architect that appears on the building permit, but the building is also attributed to architect James C. Sunderland. The builder was Harvey Stiver. The building is five-stories tall and made of brick and concrete. During construction, openings were cut which allow access between the two buildings. 2020-2024 Walnut Street has an open floor plate like 2026-2030 Walnut Street, however, unlike 2026-2030 Walnut, 2020-2024 Walnut has an internal concrete structural system.

The loading dock was first added in 1943, but only expanded to its current size between 1951 and 1963. The roof of the 1943 portion can be distinguished because it sits lower than the circa 1963 portion.

Uses 
The buildings have been commercial since their original construction. The buildings were associated with the railways until 1961, when they were acquired by a tenant that did not rely on the railway to transport goods. As of May 10, 2022, the buildings were vacant.

References 

National Register of Historic Places in Kansas City, Missouri
Downtown Kansas City